Christina-Johanne Schröder  (born 6 December 1983 in Bremen) is a Green German politician and Member of the Bundestag.

Biography
Schröder grew up in Berne, Germany. From 2003 to 2008 she studied to teach German and history at the universities of Oldenburg, Wuppertal and Bremen. Until 2013 she worked as a salesperson in Brake (Unterweser). Afterwards she studied social sciences in Oldenburg and graduated as a  Bachelor of Arts in 2015. She studied Political Management, Public Policy and Public Administration at the University of Duisburg-Essen's NRW School of Governance, graduating in 2017 with a master's degree.

In 2009 Schröder married. She resides in Berne.

Career
Schröder joined the Green Party in 2009. Since 2011 she has been serving as a member of the Kreistag of Wesermarsch. She unsuccessfully stood in the 2017 German federal election as the Green candidate for the constituency of Delmenhorst – Wesermarsch – Oldenburg-Land (constituency 28) and on the Lower Saxon Green state list.

From 2018 until 2019, Schröder served as chief of staff to state representative Christian Meyer in the State Parliament of Saxony. She subsequently worked as advisor on housing and construction to the Green Party’s group in the State Parliament.

At the 2021 German federal election she stood as the Green candidate for constituency 28. Schröder was elected to the Bundestag through the Green state list. She has since been serving on the Committee on Housing, Urban Development and Construction and the Committee on Agriculture.

References

External links

 
 Christina-Johanne Schröder at the Bundestag
 

1983 births
21st-century German women politicians
Living people
Members of the Bundestag 2021–2025
Members of the Bundestag for Alliance 90/The Greens
Members of the Bundestag for Lower Saxony
People from Wesermarsch